This page details football records in the Republic of Ireland.

League

Team records

Titles
Most top-flight League titles: 20, Shamrock Rovers
Most consecutive League titles:  4, 
  Shamrock Rovers (1983-84 to 1986-87).

Top-flight Appearances
Most appearances: 92 seasons, Bohemians (1921–present)

Points records
Most points in a season: 87, Dundalk  (2018)

Goals records
Most goals in a season: 85, Dundalk (2018)

Runs
Longest unbeaten run  ????
 (2021)Featuring in European Football in consecutive seasons: 12, Shelbourne FCUnbeaten seasons: 2, Shamrock Rovers

Individual records

League Goalscorers
 235, Brendan Bradley

Most deliveries in a season
Kieran Sadlier 117
Cork City 2017

Most appearances
 634 , Al Finucane

Cup

Team recordsMost final wins: 25, Shamrock Rovers Most appearances: 33, Shamrock RoversMost appearances without winning: 2, joint record:
 Brideville (1927, 1930)
 Dolphin (1932, 1933)
 Cork Celtic (1964, 1969)Most final loses: 11, ShelbourneHighest scoring game: 4-3, joint record
 Bohemians 4 - 3 Dundalk
 Derry City 4 - 3 St. Patrick's Athletic (aet)

League Cup

Team recordsMost final wins: 11, Derry City Most appearances: 13, Derry CityMost appearances without winning:''' 3, Finn Harps

Total titles won

Gold - current winners of competition (were active).

References

Ireland
Association football in the Republic of Ireland